Nāti (Naati, Nahati) is a nearly extinct Oceanic language of southwest Malekula, Vanuatu.

References

Malekula languages
Languages of Vanuatu
Critically endangered languages